Rubino is a town in southeastern Ivory Coast. It is a sub-prefecture and commune of Agboville Department in Agnéby-Tiassa Region, Lagunes District.

In 2021, the population of the sub-prefecture of Rubino was 32,775.

Villages
The 12 villages of the sub-prefecture of Rubino and their population in 2014 are:

References

Sub-prefectures of Agnéby-Tiassa
Communes of Agnéby-Tiassa